Rauf Huseynli (born 25 January 2000) is an Azerbaijani footballer who plays as a defender for Shamakhi FK in the Azerbaijan Premier League.

Club career
On 1 February 2020, Huseynli made his debut in the Azerbaijan Premier League for Zira match against Sabah.

References

External links
 

2000 births
Living people
Association football defenders
Azerbaijani footballers
Azerbaijan youth international footballers
Azerbaijan under-21 international footballers
Azerbaijan Premier League players
Qarabağ FK players
Zira FK players
Shamakhi FK players